Talovka is a rural locality (a selo) and the administrative center of Talovsky Selsoviet of Zmeinogorsky District, Altai Krai, Russia. The population was 169 as of 2016. There are 7 streets.

Geography 
Talovka is located on the bank of the Talovka River, 49 km northwest of Zmeinogorsk (the district's administrative centre) by road. Nikolsk is the nearest rural locality.

Ethnicity 
The village is inhabited by Russians and others.

References 

Rural localities in Zmeinogorsky District